Northern Virginia Majestics was an American women’s soccer team, founded in 1998 that played in the United Soccer Leagues W-League, the second tier of women’s soccer in the United States and Canada in the Atlantic Division of the Eastern Conference. The team is the women's team of Northern Virginia FC, which plays in the USL League Two. They also operated teams in the Super Y League for youth. The team played home games at Hellwig Memorial Field Stadium in the city of Manassas, Virginia. The team's colors are gold, blue and white.

History
Part of Northern Virginia FC, the Majestics were formed in 1998 as the women's senior team. They joined the USL W-League in 1999, joining the W-2 division, playing in the South Division. They played their home opener on May 8 against the Indiana Blaze. They had a difficult debut season, going winless, finishing with an 0-11 record. Like most teams in the division, their roster was made up of primarily high school and college players.

Over their thirteen seasons, the Majestics reached the W-League playoffs four times (2002, 2003, 2006 and 2007). On the youth side, Northern Virginia Majestics and male equivalent Northern Virginia Royals were named the fifth best Super Y-League club program in North America. In 2008, the Majestics were inducted into the USL Soccer Hall of Fame, as a 10+ Club, earning the honor for the longevity of their programs in North America.

The team ended its operations following the 2012 season, although they continued to operate their Super Y U20 program.

Several players earned All W-League First and Second Team selections and Players of the Week honors. In addition, player Elizabeth Baidu won W-League Rookie of the Year and coach Hank Leung won Coach of the Year (Hank Leung) in 2002. The Majestics also won Executive of the Year honors in 2000 and in 2011, with owner/general Tim Schweitzer. Schweitzer was also USL Soccer Hall of Fame under the Builder category in 2011 for his work with the Majestics.

Year-by-year
The record for the Majestics in their seasons:

Notable former players
 Ali Krieger 
 Elizabeth Baidu 
 Alberta Sackey 
 Adjoa Bayor 
 Basilea Amoah-Tetteh

References

External links
 Official Site
  Northern Virginia Majestics on USL Soccer

   

Women's soccer clubs in the United States
Sports in Northern Virginia
Prince William County, Virginia
Soccer clubs in Virginia
USL W-League (1995–2015) teams
Association football clubs established in 1998
1998 establishments in Virginia
Women's sports in Virginia